Motol University Hospital is a large teaching hospital in the Motol area of Prague. It is the largest medical facility in the Czech Republic and one of the largest in Europe. It is a major teaching base for students from the Second Faculty of Medicine, and also for some students from other faculties mainly the First Faculty of Medicine.  The Nemocnice Motol metro station nearby is named after it.

This hospital has 2,410 beds. 860,000 patients treated a year as out-patients and 70,000 treated per year as in-patients. The hospital is served by almost 5,000 staff.

See also 
 Bulovka Hospital, another major teaching hospital complex in Prague

Teaching hospitals
Hospitals in Prague
Hospitals established in 1943